Gordon Hooker (29 May 1887 – 6 December 1967) was a New Zealand rugby league player who represented New Zealand in 1909.

Playing career
Hooker represented Taranaki in 1908 and was selected to tour Australia for New Zealand in 1909, where he played in two Test matches.

He represented Queensland against the 1910 Great Britain Lions before returning to New Zealand and playing for Taranaki against the 1914 Lions. He played until he was 36.

In the 1930s Hooker helped re-establish rugby league in Taranaki. He died in 1967 and his ashes were buried at Te Henui Cemetery.

Legacy
In 2008 he was named in the Taranaki Rugby League Team of the Century.

References

1887 births
1967 deaths
New Zealand rugby league players
New Zealand national rugby league team players
Taranaki rugby league team players
Rugby league wingers
Queensland rugby league team players
Burials at Te Henui Cemetery